Mikalay Yazerski (born 17 June 1984) is a retired Belarusian professional footballer.

Honours
Naftan Novopolotsk
Belarusian Cup winner: 2008–09, 2011–12

External links

1984 births
Living people
Belarusian footballers
FC Naftan Novopolotsk players
FC Neman Grodno players
Association football defenders